Chaponost is a commune in the Rhône department in eastern France.

It is known for its Roman aqueducts.

Monuments

The Roman aqueduct of the Gier, estimated to be 75 km long, was built under Hadrian's reign during the second century CE to enable water supply of the Roman city of Lugdunum (Lyon) from Mont Pilat (source of the river Gier). Arches of the aqueducts (around 92 arches on 550 m) are located on the territory of the commune, at the site of "Le Plat de l'Air".

Population

Twin towns
Chaponost is twinned with:

  Lesignano de' Bagni, Italy, since 2008

See also
 Communes of the Rhône department

References

Communes of Rhône (department)